is a Japanese footballer who plays for Tochigi SC.

Club statistics
Updated to 23 February 2016.

References

External links

 Profile at Tochigi SC

1992 births
Living people
Osaka University of Health and Sport Sciences alumni
Association football people from Osaka Prefecture
Japanese footballers
J3 League players
Gainare Tottori players
Tochigi SC players
Association football midfielders
People from Fujiidera, Osaka